Massachusetts Stingers was an American women’s soccer team, founded in 2004. The team was a member of the Women's Premier Soccer League, the third tier of women’s soccer in the United States and Canada. The team plays in the North Division of the Eastern Conference. The team folded after the 2007 season.

Players

Current roster

Notable former players

Year-by-year

Honors

Competition History

Coaches

Stadia

Average Attendance

External links

Women's Premier Soccer League teams
Women's soccer clubs in the United States
Soccer clubs in Massachusetts
2004 establishments in Massachusetts
2007 disestablishments in Massachusetts